Lecythis lurida is a species of woody plant in the family Lecythidaceae of the order Ericales.

It is endemic to Brazil, where is known as castanha-jarana.

It is found in the states of Amazonas, Bahia, Espírito Santo, Pará, Pernambuco, Piauí, Rio de Janeiro, and Sergipe.

It is threatened by habitat loss.

References

lurida
Endemic flora of Brazil
Flora of Bahia
Flora of Espírito Santo
Flora of Pará
Flora of Pernambuco
Flora of Rio de Janeiro (state)
Environment of Piauí
Environment of Sergipe
Conservation dependent plants
Near threatened flora of South America
Taxonomy articles created by Polbot
Plants described in 1874